Tri-Lakes can refer to a place in the United States:

 Tri-Lakes, Colorado
 Tri-Lakes, Indiana
 A portion of the Ozarks in Southwestern Missouri served by the Branson Tri-Lakes News.